Henry Ryder (1777–1836) was a British clergyman, Bishop of Gloucester then Lichfield.

Henry Ryder may also refer to:
 Henry Ryder (priest) (died 1755), British clergyman, Archdeacon of Derby
 Henry Ryder, 4th Earl of Harrowby (1836–1900), British peer and banker
 Henry Ignatius Dudley Ryder (1837–1907), British Roman Catholic clergyman

See also
 Henry Rider (died 1696), Anglo-Irish clergyman, Bishop of Killaloe
 H. Rider Haggard (1856–1925), British author